Faxfleet is a hamlet in the East Riding of Yorkshire, England.

With Yokefleet and Bellasize, Faxfleet forms part of the civil parish of Blacktoft. Faxfleet lies within the constituency of Haltemprice and Howden, an area placed as the 10th most affluent in the country in a 2003 Barclays Private Clients survey.

Faxfleet was the location of the Faxfleet Preceptory, a former community of the Knights Templar. It was one of Yorkshire's principal preceptories, valued at more than £290 (equivalent to £ in ). when it was closed in 1308.

In 1823 Faxfleet was listed as in the parish of South Cave, and in the Wapentake of Harthill. Population was 163, with occupations including three farmers and a brick & tile maker. There was a gentleman who lived at the Hall, and two yeomen.

References

External links

Villages in the East Riding of Yorkshire